The Elizabeth and Michael Sorel Charitable Organization, commonly known as the Sorel Organization, is a non-profit based in New York City. Its mission is "to keep musical excellence alive and to help expand the boundaries for women in music". The organization sponsors several competitions for women composers, conductors, and musicians, including the Sorel Medallions. The Sorel Organization was founded in 1996 by Claudette Sorel.

References

External links
Official site

Non-profit organizations based in New York (state)
Women in music